CTtransit (styled as CT transit) is a bus system serving much of the U.S. state of Connecticut and is a division of that state's Department of Transportation. CTtransit provides bus service via contract providers for seven different metropolitan areas in the state, mostly concentrated in Hartford and New Haven counties. CTtransit began operations in 1976.

History
HNS Management, Inc., is the principal operator of CTtransit service in the greater Hartford, New Haven, and Stamford areas.  They are the second largest public transit system in New England with a total fleet of over 400 buses and over 27 million customers served each year.  HNS employs nearly 980 bus operators, maintenance employees, and administrative personnel; the company administers an annual operating budget of over $100 million.  CTtransit is owned by, and management reports to staff of, the Connecticut Department of Transportation, Bureau of Public Transportation.

Early history
Public transportation in Connecticut dates back to the 19th Century, with the introduction of horse-drawn trolley lines in many towns across the state.  In 1901, the Connecticut Railway and Lighting Company was formed to operate and extend electric powered trolley services.  These operations were leased to the Consolidated Railway Company in 1906 and, a year later, merged with the New York, New Haven and Hartford Railroad.

In 1910, the New Haven Railroad formally sublet all of its street railway operations to the Connecticut Company, and service continued to expand throughout the next two decades.  By 1924, the Connecticut Company operated some 1,640-passenger cars over a network of 834 miles of trolley track.

Both the New Haven Railroad and Connecticut Company suffered financial setbacks during the Depression years. In 1936, the Connecticut Railway and Lighting Company (CR&L) returned to the transit business, having petitioned the Federal courts for restoration of its original transit property when Connecticut Company was not able to maintain lease payments. CR&L operated bus motor coaches on all of its lines.  Although the manufacture of transit buses was virtually halted during World War II, new production after the war allowed the Connecticut Company to complete the replacement of all its former trolley lines in 1948.

The 1950s inaugurated a period of decline for public transportation nationwide.  Suburbanization, increased automobile ownership, public investment in new highway construction, and declining profitability in the transit business led to a vicious circle of rising fares, service cuts, and declining ridership.  Following the abandonment of its various local operations, the Connecticut Company was sold in 1964 to the Colony Company, headed by E. Clayton Gengras.

The CR&L surrendered its last transit operating franchises in 1973, and in June 1976 Gengras sold the three remaining divisions of the Connecticut Company (Hartford, New Haven, and Stamford) to the State of Connecticut.

Public ownership

When the Connecticut Department of Transportation acquired the assets of the Connecticut Company, it contracted with a private management company to operate the system.  Since 1979, First Transit, Inc. (formerly ATE Management and Service Company and Ryder/ATE) has provided contract management services to the State in managing the day-to-day operations of CTTRANSIT.  H.N.S. Management Company (the letters symbolize the three divisions: Hartford, New Haven, and Stamford) is a wholly owned sub corporation of First Transit, established as the legal entity to perform the management contact.

Today, the management of CTtransit reports to CTDOT’s Bureau of Public Transportation.  CTDOT staff performs directly many functions that support the day-to-day transit operation, such as capital procurement, long-range planning, and Federal grant applications.  In addition, CTDOT exercises oversight of the CTtransit operation through the budget process, authorization of major capital expenditures, service and fare policy, and monthly financial and performance reporting.

Divisions

CTtransit is arranged into multiple divisions:

Hartford Division, the largest division of CTtransit, providing local and express bus service within Hartford County, connecting to the Pioneer Valley Transit Authority in Enfield, Connecticut near the state line, 9 Town Transit and Middletown Area Transit at the Middletown bus terminal, CTfastrak at Westfarms Mall, and the CTtransit New Britain Division in downtown New Britain, and CTtransit Waterbury in Torrington. Additionally, it connects with Windham Region Transit District and UConn Transportation Services in Storrs, CT. This division operates seven days a week.
New Haven Division, serving the city of New Haven and nearby suburbs, with connections to the Greater Bridgeport Transportation Authority at Derby-Shelton Station, Milford Transit District and the Coastal Link at the Connecticut Post Mall, 9 Town Transit at the Madison Scranton Gazebo and CTtransit Waterbury Division in Wallingford and Meriden. Service is provided seven days a week.
Stamford Division, serving the Stamford area, with connections to the Bee-Line System in White Plains and Port Chester, Hudson Link in White Plains, and Norwalk Transit, HARTransit, and the Coastal Link in Norwalk, Connecticut. Bus service is provided seven days a week.
Waterbury Division, serving the city of Waterbury and immediate surrounding areas with local service Connections are available to New Haven Division and CTfastrak to Hartford in downtown Waterbury. Service is provided seven days a week on most routes.
New Britain and Bristol Divisions, providing local service in New Britain and Bristol and surrounding towns seven days a week, with connections to CTtransit Hartford along the Berlin Turnpike, Meriden Square Mall, and in downtown New Britain.
Meriden Division, serving the city of Meriden with three local routes. Connections are available to Middletown Area Transit and CTtransit New Haven C route at the Meriden Railroad Station, and to the New Britain Division at Meriden Square Mall. Service operates Monday through Friday with a limited Saturday schedule.
Wallingford Division, consisting of two routes that loop on an hourly basis around the town of Wallingford, Connecticut, connecting to CTtransit New Haven in downtown Wallingford.
CTfastrak, a bus rapid transit system with routes operating on a dedicated roadway between Hartford and New Britain, as well as connecting routes operating on regular roadways to outlying towns.

Governance

CTtransit is operated by HNS Management/First Transit, serving Hartford, New Haven, and Stamford.  DATTCO and New Britain Transit provide service in New Britain and now New Britain Transit operates the Bristol Service.  The Northeast Transportation Company operates the Waterbury, Meriden, and Wallingford divisions of CTtransit.  CTtransit is overseen by the Connecticut Department of Transportation, which also provides the operating budget.

Environment 

In early 2012, HNS Management made a gesture to reducing their environmental impact through the installation of a PureCell stationary fuel cell system for their headquarters on Leibert Road in Hartford, Conn. The fuel cell provides 400 kilowatts (kW) of power to the 330,000 square-foot facility.  Thermal energy from the fuel cell will be used to pre-heat two boilers that support the building’s primary heating system.

By generating power on-site with a fuel cell, CTtransit will prevent the release of more than 827 metric tons of carbon dioxide annually – the equivalent of planting more than 191 acres of trees.  The reduction in nitrogen oxide emissions compared to a conventional power plant are equal to the environmental benefit of removing more than 102 cars from the road.  In addition to the reduction in greenhouse gas emissions, the PureCell system will enable CTtransit to save nearly 3.6 million gallons of water annually.

As of July 2022, CT Transit operated 12 electric buses.  In July 2022, one caught fire, requiring the hospitalization of three people.

Funding

CTtransit’s annual revenue is primarily made up of fare revenue, advertising, and reimbursements for services through contracts with state agencies (primarily access to jobs). The State of Connecticut subsidizes the operations of CTtransit in the amount of the annual operating deficit.
 
Numbers for FY2013:

References

https://www.cttransit.com/routes/local-service

https://web.archive.org/web/20170714124537/http://mcicoach.com/media-center/2017-01-11-ct-dot.htm

External links

Bus transportation in Connecticut
Organizations established in 1976
Transit agencies in Connecticut
1976 establishments in Connecticut